This page records hostile and non-hostile overseas casualties of the Republic of Korea Armed Forces since the end of the Vietnam War.
 The star sign indicates that there are uncertainty of measuring exact age due to Korean age system.
 The rank is honored posthumously in most cases. The rank system of Republic of Korea Armed Forces will be recognized.
 The cause of death is the official conclusion of the Republic of Korea Armed Forces.
 The place of death is recorded as the official name when the event has taken.

References

Military of South Korea